A children's hospital is a medical facility that offers its services exclusively to children and adolescents. Most children's hospitals can serve children from birth up to the age of 21. The number of children's hospitals proliferated in the 20th century, as pediatric medical and surgical specialties separated from internal medicine and adult surgical specialties.

Children's hospitals are characterized by greater attention to the psychosocial support of children and their families. Some children and young people have to spend relatively long periods in the hospital, so having access to play and teaching staff can also be an important part of their care. With local partnerships, this can include trips to local botanical gardens, the zoo, and public libraries, for instance.

In addition to psychosocial support, children's hospitals have the added benefit of being staffed by professionals who are trained in treating children. A medical doctor that undertakes vocational training in pediatrics must also be accepted for membership by a professional college before they can practice pediatrics. While many normal hospitals can treat children adequately, pediatric specialists may be a better choice when it comes to treating rare afflictions that may prove fatal or severely detrimental to young children, in some cases before birth. Also, many children's hospitals will continue to see children with rare illnesses into adulthood, allowing for continuity of care.

Notable children's hospitals

References 

children's hospitals